Shafik Al-Wazzan (January 16, 1925 – July 8, 1999) was a Lebanese politician who served as the 27th Prime Minister of Lebanon from 1980 until 1984. In December 1991, Wazzan was wounded when a car bomb exploded in the Beirut neighborhood of Basta Al Fouka (where he lived) as he was passing through in an armored car.

Biography
After political strife had left Lebanon without a government for 137 days, Wazzan was urged into office. He oversaw the withdrawal of Palestinian guerillas from Beirut in 1982. The next year he successfully negotiated for Israel to withdraw from Lebanon.

Wazzan had a son (Dr. Wassim Al Wazzan) and a daughter. He died in 1999 at the age of 74.

References 

1925 births
1999 deaths
Lebanese Sunni Muslims
Politicians from Beirut
Prime Ministers of Lebanon